Aubrey Dexter (March 29, 1898 – May 2, 1958) was a British stage and film actor.

Partial filmography

 East of Shanghai (1931) - Colonel (uncredited)
 Loyalties (1933) - Kentman (uncredited)
 Out of the Past (1933) - David Mannering
 The Love Test (1935) - Vice-President
 Cross Currents (1935) - Colonel Bagge-Grant
 The Private Secretary (1935) - Gibson
 Whom the Gods Love (1936) - Minor Role (uncredited)
 It's in the Bag (1936) - Peters
 Please Teacher (1937) - Reeves
 The Show Goes On (1937)
 Sixty Glorious Years (1938) - Prince of Wales
 Young Man's Fancy (1939) - Soames
 His Brother's Keeper (1940) - Sylvester
 Gaslight (1940) - House Agent
 Old Mother Riley in Society (1940) - Nugent
 The House of the Arrow (1940) - Giradot
 Saloon Bar (1940) - Major
 London Belongs to Me (1948) - Mr. Battlebury
 Room to Let (1950) - Harding
 Night and the City (1950) - Fergus Chilk, Kristo's Lawyer (uncredited)
 Stars in Your Eyes (1956) - Farrow
 The Counterfeit Plan (1957) - Joe Lepton
 The Prince and the Showgirl (1957) - The Ambassador (final film role)

Bibliography
 Low, Rachael. History of the British Film: Filmmaking in 1930s Britain. George Allen & Unwin, 1985 .

References

External links

1898 births
1958 deaths
English male film actors
English male stage actors
Male actors from London
20th-century English male actors